Loughton is a town and civil parish in the Epping Forest District of Essex.

The parish of Loughton covers part of Epping Forest, in 1996 some parts of the south of the old parish were transferred to Buckhurst Hill parish, and other small portions to Chigwell and Theydon Bois. It is the most populous civil parish in the Epping Forest district, and within Essex it is the second most populous civil parish (after Canvey Island) and the second largest in the area. At the 2021 census, it had a population of 33,353.

Loughton has three conservation areas and there are 56 listed buildings in the town, together with a further 50 that are locally listed.

History

The earliest structure in Loughton is Loughton Camp, an Iron Age earth fort in Epping Forest dating from around 500 BC. Hidden by dense undergrowth for centuries, it was rediscovered in 1872.

The first references to the site of modern-day Loughton date from the Anglo-Saxon period when it was known as Lukintune ("the farm of Luhha"). The earliest written evidence of this settlement is in the charter of Edward the Confessor in 1062 which granted various estates, including Tippedene (Debden) and Alwartune (Alderton Hall, in Loughton), to Harold Godwinson (later King Harold II) following his re-founding of Waltham Abbey. Following the Norman conquest, the town is also mentioned in the Domesday Book of 1086, with the name Lochintuna.

The settlement remained a small village until the early 17th century when the high road was extended north through the forest. The road quickly became the main route from London to Cambridge and East Anglia, and Loughton grew into an important stop with coaching inns. The most significant of the great houses of this period, built as country retreats for wealthy City merchants and courtiers, was Loughton Hall, owned by Mary Tudor two months before she became Queen Mary of England in 1553, and later by the Wroth family from 1578 to 1738. Sir Robert Wroth ( – 1614) and his wife Lady Mary Wroth (1587 – ) entertained many of the great literary figures of the time, including Ben Jonson, at the house. It was rebuilt in 1878 by Revd. J. W. Maitland, whose family held the manor for much of the 19th century. It is now a Veecare Homes care home and is a grade II listed building.

Loughton's growth since Domesday has largely been at the expense of the forest. Expansion towards the River Roding was arrested owing to the often flooding marshy meadows, encroachments into the forest to the north and west of the village were nevertheless possible. Loughton landlords and villagers both exploited the forest waste (open spaces and scrub of the forest), but the trickle of forest destruction threatened to turn into a flood in the 19th century after royalty had lost interest in protecting the woodland as a hunting reserve. As the forest disappeared and landowners began enclosing more of it for private use, many began to express concern at the loss of such a significant natural resource and common land. Some Loughton villagers defied landowners to practice their ancient right to lop wood—a series of court cases, including one brought by the Loughton labourer Thomas Willingale, was needed before the City of London Corporation took legal action against the landowners' enclosures, resulting in the Epping Forest Act of 1878 which preserved the forest for use by the public.

The arrival of the railway spurred on the town's development. The railway first came to Loughton in 1856 when the Eastern Counties Railway (later the Great Eastern Railway) opened a branch line via Woodford. In 1948 the line was electrified and transferred to London Transport to become part of the Central line on the London Underground. The arrival of the railway also provided visitors from London with a convenient means of reaching Epping Forest and thus transforming it into the "East Enders' Playground".  The Ragged School Union began organising visits to the forest for parties of poor East End children in 1891 paid for by the Pearsons Fresh Air Fund. Loughton artist Octavius Dixie Deacon depicted many scenes of the town including some of its residents during the late Victorian period. 

As the Great Eastern Railway Company did not offer workmen's fares, the town's development was of a middle-class character. Much of the housing in Loughton was built in the Victorian and Edwardian eras, with significant expansion in the 1930s. Loughton was a fashionable place for artistic and scientific residents in Victorian and Edwardian times, and a number of prominent residents were renowned socialists, nonconformists, and social reformers. In the north-east is a post-war development being one of the London County Council's country estates. Built with the express purpose of co-locating industrial, retail and residential properties to facilitate supported re-location of London families affected by war damage within the Capital. Located within Debden's industrial estate is the former printing works of the Bank of England; in 1993 the printing works were taken over by De La Rue on their winning the contract to print the banknotes. The headquarters of greeting card company Clinton Cards and construction firm Higgins Group are also located within the Debden Industrial Estate. In 2008, electronics firm Amshold announced their intention to move the group's headquarters to Loughton from Brentwood. They moved to a site in Langston Road; in 2012, their property company Amsprop converted a headquarters building next to the Town Council offices in Rectory Lane.

In 2002 Loughton featured in the ITV1 programme Essex Wives, a documentary series about the lives of some of the nouveau riche who have resided in the Essex satellite towns of London since the 1980s. The series propelled Jodie Marsh, one of its featured characters, to fame. Journalists' use of the term "golden triangle" to describe the towns of Loughton, Buckhurst Hill and Chigwell for their propensity to attract wealthy footballers, soap-opera actors and TV celebrities as residents derives from this.
The town has been used as a backdrop in other television series, notably The Only Way is Essex, and two shops in the High Road are associated with members of its cast.

Geography
Loughton is bounded by Epping Forest to the west and the Roding river valley to the east. After the Epping Forest Act of 1878 prohibited any further expansion of the town into the forest, the forest and the river have formed two natural barriers constraining any expansion westwards or eastwards, and consequently most of the growth in the last 100 years has been through infilling and construction of new housing estates to the north and south of the old town centre, plus the purpose-built suburb of Debden to the north-east. The Roding valley is somewhat marshy and the river is prone to flooding, so construction close to the river is very limited and the majority of the land around it has been designated as a nature reserve or left as open space parkland. The M11 motorway that follows the course of the Roding along this section of its length is built on raised banks or flyovers, to avoid potential problems with flooding.

The highest parts of the town are the roads that border the forest's edge; from the green outside the Gardeners Arms pub near the junction of York Hill, Pump Hill and Baldwins Hill there are views of London, south-west Essex, Kent and Surrey. From here, on a clear day, there is a panoramic view of London landmarks and the North Downs beyond. There are numerous other fine views from different parts of the town, including one roughly at the junction of Traps Hill, Borders Lane, Alderton Hill and Spareleaze Hill, and another on Spring Grove and Hillcrest Road. In the valley between these two hills flows Loughton Brook, which rises in Epping Forest near Waltham Abbey and flows through the forest and Baldwins and Staples Ponds before traversing the town and emptying into the Roding.

There are several distinctive neighbourhoods in Loughton mostly identifiable by the building types incorporated during their development:

Old Loughton refers to the original settlement which grew up around Loughton High Road.
Debden occupies about 650 acres/225 hectares to the north east of Loughton; London County Council built the woodland development between 1947 and 1952 out of county to rehouse people from London whose homes had been destroyed or damaged during the Second World War. The largest open space in Debden is Jessel Green, an open hillside towards its centre, deliberately planned as a central open resource by the LCC.
Debden Green is a hamlet set around an ancient green in the north-east corner of the parish. Debden House in Debden Green is an adult learning and conference centre run by the London Borough of Newham; the grounds include a campsite.
Goldings Manor is a modern estate of mostly large detached houses built in the grounds of 'Goldings Manor', a large mansion demolished after being hit during the Blitz. It comprises four residential streets; Broadstrood, Campions, Garden Way and Stanmore Way.
Great Woodcote Park is a modern housing estate at the southern end of Loughton, built on the site of the former North Farm.
Little Cornwall is a hilly area of north-west Loughton closest to Epping Forest characterised by steep hills, weatherboarded houses, narrow lanes and high holly hedges.
Roding Estate or South Loughton is the area south-east of the London Underground Central line and was mostly built up between the First World War and Second World War.

Between 1839 and 31 March 2000 policing and crime prevention was provided by the Metropolitan Police. From 1 April 2000 responsibilities were transferred to the Essex Police following the creation of the Greater London Authority. Telephone numbers in the town have the London (020) area code.

Demography 
At the 2021 census, Loughton had a population of 33,353, an increase from 31,106 in 2011.

The 2021 census showed that 73.5% of the town's population identified as White British. In 2016, Loughton was assessed by the Policy Exchange as the third best ethnically integrated town in the country.

Politics

Loughton Urban District Council, established in 1900 was based at Lopping Hall. The area became part of Chigwell Urban District in 1933 and remained as such until 1974, when Epping Forest District Council was created. Loughton Town Council was established in 1996. The Town Council consists of 22 councillors representing 7 wards, elected for a four-year term. The Town Council started off in temporary accommodation, but in 2000 moved to offices on the newly constructed Buckingham Court in Rectory Lane. In 2017, the council moved to the newly redesignated Loughton Library and Town Hall in the town centre.

At district council level, Loughton is represented by two councillors from each of the 7 wards, elected for a four-year term. At county council level, Loughton is split between three divisions, Buckhurst Hill & Loughton South, Chigwell & Loughton Broadway, and Loughton Central, each returning one councillor elected for a four-year term.

Loughton has been part of the Epping Forest parliamentary constituency since its creation in 1974.

The arts

Drama
Loughton is home to the East 15 Acting School. East 15 grew from the work of Joan Littlewood's famed Theatre Workshop. Joan Littlewood's Theatre Workshop was based in Stratford, London, whose postal district is E15. The School, which became part of the University of Essex in 2000, includes the Corbett Theatre in its campus. Regular productions are staged at the theatre, which was named after Harry H. Corbett (1925–1982), himself a Theatre Workshop member and benefactor of East 15. The theatre building is actually a converted medieval flint barn from Ditchling, Sussex which was dismantled and rebuilt in Loughton.

The character actor Jack Watling (1923–2001) lived in Alderton Hall, Loughton. His son, Giles (born 1953), also an actor, was born there. Actor and playwright Ken Campbell (1941–2008), nicknamed 'The Elf of Epping Forest', lived in Baldwins Hill, Loughton, where a blue plaque to him was erected in 2013. Comedy-drama actor Alan Davies (born 1966) grew up in Loughton, and attended Staples Road school. Actress Jane Carr (born 1950), best known for her role as "Louise Mercer" in the American version of the sitcom Dear John from 1988 to 1992, was born in Loughton.

Amateur drama is performed mainly at Lopping Hall. Performances are from Loughton Amateur Dramatic Society, founded in 1924, which until 2006 alternated with those from the now-defunct West Essex Repertory Company, founded in 1945. Lopping Hall opened in 1884 and was paid for by the Corporation of London to compensate villagers for the loss of traditional rights to lop wood in Epping Forest, rights which were bought out when the management of the forest was taken over by the corporation in 1878. Lopping Hall served as Loughton's town hall and was the venue for most of the parish's social – and especially musical - activities during the early 20th century. There are ambitious plans by the Trustees for the building's restoration. There is also a full-scale theatre, the College Theatre, on the campus of Epping Forest College.

Music
Loughton's classical music scene dates back to the late 19th century, when there were regular concerts by the Loughton Choral Society in Lopping Hall under the conductorship of Henry Riding. Today, performances are mainly at two venues: Loughton Methodist Church hosts the annual Loughton Youth Music Festival, which showcases talented pupils from local schools and colleges. St. John's Church festival choir undertakes extensive overseas tours, and in turn hosts well-known soloists, chamber and operatic groups. The music hall artiste José Collins (1887–1958) lived at 107 High Road. The hymn writer Sarah Flower Adams (1805–1848) lived with her husband William Bridges Adams (1797–1872) at a house called 'Sunnybank', demolished in 1888 and replaced by No. 9 Woodbury Hill. Sarah's most famous hymn was "Nearer, My God, to Thee", apparently written at Loughton in 1840, while William, a locomotive engineer, was the inventor of the fishplate used to connect rail tracks.

Loughton is also home to the National Jazz Archive (see below), which hosts occasional jazz performances. Gladys Mills (1918–1978), a music-hall pianist who performed as "Mrs Mills", lived in Roding Road from 1934, and upon her marriage in 1947, in Barncroft Close until 1964. Loughton boasts a few rock and pop music connections; Mark Knopfler of Dire Straits was a lecturer at Loughton College (now Epping Forest College), and the Genesis song "The Battle of Epping Forest" is based on an actual event when rival East End gangs fought a turf war in the forest. Ray Dorset, the lead singer of Mungo Jerry, had his first taste of fame when his band 'The Tramps' won the Loughton Beat Contest in 1964.

Roding Players is an amateur orchestra which rehearses at Roding Valley High School and gives three concerts a year in the Epping Forest area; composer Miles Harwood is Musical Director. Loughton Ladies Choir gives regular afternoon concerts in the Epping Forest area. Epping Forest Brass Band, founded in 1935, also has regular concerts in the Epping Forest area, and competes in national competitions and exhibitions. Loughton Cinema had a resident ladies' band during the 1930s. Music at the LMC is a series of concerts given by visiting artists in the winter months.

Loughton also has its own music academy the 'Loughton Music Academy' founded in 2001. Performances are with full orchestral participation. The 'Community Music Initiative' or CMI is a charitable project led by the LMA which provides music lessons for schools in the area who do not benefit from musical facilities.

Loughton Folk Club was founded on 28 October 2010 and held its first Loughton Folk Day on 9 April 2011. The Club meets weekly at 8pm at Loughton Club, Station Road, Loughton.

Opera and dance
In the 1930s, Loughton was home to the Pollards Operas, outdoor operatic performances in the garden of a large house. These were directed by Iris Lemare (1902–1997) and produced by Geoffrey Dunn (1903–1981), a prominent impresario, actor and cinematographer, and included several first British performances of operas. Loughton Operatic Society, founded in 1894, is one of the oldest arts organisations in Essex, and still stages regular musicals and operas at Lopping Hall.

Epping Forest District Council's Arts Unit, Epping Forest Arts, stages occasional dance-based performance works in Loughton, with community and schools participation.  Harlow Ballet, which stages full-scale amateur ballet productions at Harlow Playhouse, also recruits in the area.

Visual arts
The sculptor and painter Sir Jacob Epstein (1880–1959) lived at 'Deerhurst' between 1933 and 1950, after having rented no. 49 Baldwins Hill; he produced some of works there. Sculptor Elsa Fraenkel lived at Elm Lodge, Church Lane, after World War II. Artist John Strevens (1902–1990) lived at 8 Lower Park Road from 1963 until his death. Walter Spradbury (1889–1969), best known for his iconic interwar London Transport posters, lived nearby in Buckhurst Hill. Octavius Deacon was a 19th-century naïve artist from Loughton who painted scenes of village life. William Lakin Turner lived and painted at Clovelly, York Hill, Loughton, in the 1890s. From 1908 to 1936, William Brown Macdougall, artist, and his wife, the author and translator, Margaret Armour, lived in Loughton. Juggler Mark Robertson (1963–1992) lived at 'The Avenue' and appeared at the London Palladium and on television.

The Loughton Arts Club hosts exhibitions by contemporary local artists and photographers at Loughton Library. Loughton Camera Club, a member of the East Anglian Federation of Photographic Societies, meets at Lopping Hall in Loughton, and holds regular exhibitions of members' work in Loughton Library and elsewhere.

Cinema
Early cinematic shows took place in the Lopping Hall. A purpose-built Loughton Cinema was opened by actress Evelyn Laye on 9 October 1928; designed by local architect Theodore Legg, it could seat 847. This was later reduced to 700. The cinema was renamed the Century in 1953, and closed on 25 May 1963, and has since been demolished and replaced by shops. In July 2010 Loughton Town Council organised a screening of An Education, the first film screening in Loughton since the closure of the cinema, and its success prompted the formation of the Loughton Film Society in September 2010 to redress the lack of a local cinema.

George Pearson (1875–1973), a director and film-writer in the early years of British cinematography, was headmaster of Staples Road Junior School, Loughton 1908–1913. Charles Ashton (1884 – c. 1968), film actor from the silent movie era, lived at 20 Carroll Hill, Loughton, from 1917–34. He starred in more than 20 films between 1918–29, including the first film version of The Monkey's Paw, and Kitty, based on Warwick Deeping's novel of the same name.

Several films have been set in the Loughton area, including the 2001 TV movie Hot Money, based on real events at Loughton's Bank of England printing works.

Literature
Shakespeare's Midsummer Night's Dream was perhaps written for the marriage of Sir Thomas Heneage, Vice-Chamberlain of the Royal Household to the Countess of Southampton, who lived near Loughton at Copped Hall.

Lady Mary Wroth (1586–1652), niece of poet Sir Philip Sidney, lived at Loughton Hall with her husband Sir Robert Wroth, and they turned the mansion into a centre of Jacobean literary life. Ben Jonson was a frequent visitor, and dedicated his play The Alchemist to Mary and poetry collection The Forest to Sir Robert. Lady Mary was an author in her own right, and her book Urania is generally regarded as the first full-length English novel by a woman.

Anthony Trollope (1815–1882) who lived for some time at nearby Waltham Cross, set part of his novel Phineas Finn (1869), which parodies corrupt electoral procedures, in a fictitious Loughton. Robert Hunter, lexicographer and encyclopaedist (1823-1897) built a house in Loughton, and there compiled his massive Encyclopaedic dictionary. William Wymark Jacobs (1863–1943) lived at The Outlook, Upper Park Road before moving to Feltham House, Goldings Road. Best known as the author of the short story The Monkey's Paw. Jacobs also wrote sardonic short stories based in 'Claybury', a thinly veiled fictionalisation of Loughton. Rudyard Kipling (1865–1936) stayed as a child at Goldings Hill Farm. Arthur Morrison (1863–1945), best known for his grim novels about London's East End, lived in Salcombe House, Loughton High Road. Constance E. H. Inskip (1905-1945) an Evening News journalist who also wrote three novels amongst other translation work, lived in the town until her death at the birth of her daughter. Both were buried at nearby High Beach. Hesba Stretton (1832–1911) was a children's author who lived in Loughton. Hesba Stretton was the pen name of Sarah Smith; her novels about the street children of Victorian London raised awareness of their plight. Horace Newte lived at Alderton Hall and the Chestnuts: he was a prolific novelist. Another children's writer, Winifred Darch (1884–1960), taught at Loughton County High School for Girls 1906–1935 (now Roding Valley High School), as did the hymnodist and poet, Emily Chisholm (1910–1991), who lived in Loughton at 3 Lower Park Rd.

Ruth Rendell, Baroness Rendell of Babergh (1930-2015), who lived in Shelley Grove, Loughton, was educated at Loughton County High School for Girls and subsequently worked as a journalist in Loughton at the West Essex Gazette. Some of her fiction is set in Epping Forest, and 'Little Cornwall', the hilly area of north-west Loughton close to Epping Forest, takes its name from her description in the novel The Face of Trespass. Much of her 2014 novel The Girl Next Door is set in the Loughton of 1944 and 2013.

Poets associated with Loughton include Sarah Flower Adams (1805–1848), and Sarah Catherine Martin (c. 1766 – 1826), author of the nursery rhyme "Old Mother Hubbard", who is buried in the churchyard of St. Nicholas Church, Loughton. William Sotheby (1757–1833), poet and classicist, lived at Fairmead, Loughton. Alfred, Lord Tennyson (1809–1892) lived at Beech Hill House, High Beach 1837–1840 where he wrote parts of his magnum opus "In Memoriam". John Clare (1793–1864) lived at a private asylum at High Beach 1837–1841. The First World War poet Edward Thomas (1878–1917) also lived at High Beach 1915–1917. The poet George Barker (1913–1991) was born at 116 Forest Road, Loughton. Geoffrey Ainger (1925–2013), who wrote the Christmas carols "Born in the Night", "Mary's Child", "Do Shepherds Stand" and several other hymns, was Methodist minister of Loughton 1958–63. Ralph Russell, foremost Western scholar of Urdu language and literature, lived in Queens Road as a child and attended Staples Road School.

T. E. Lawrence bought land at Pole Hill in Chingford after the First World War and constructed a hut and swimming pool there. After the Chingford Urban District council bought the land in 1930 and demolished his structures, he re-erected the hut in the grounds of The Warren in Loughton in 1931. The hut remains there, but in a state of disrepair.

Museum and archives

Loughton is home to two national archives:

 The British Postal Museum Store, in Lenthall Road, houses objects ranging from the desk of Rowland Hill (founder of the Penny Post), to mobile post office vehicles and an astounding range of post boxes.
 The National Jazz Archive is housed in Loughton Library and Town Hall; it is the national repository and research centre for printed material, photographs and memorabilia relating to jazz, with an emphasis on British jazz. Founded by jazz trumpeter Digby Fairweather in 1988, it includes a collection of British jazz recordings, photographs, posters and memorabilia. The archive holds regular celebrity and live jazz events.

Funding was pledged in 2006 to help establish a Street Museum in Loughton. There is also an Epping Forest District Museum store in the town, but this is not open to the public.

A number of Loughton buildings, including the Masonic Hall, Lopping Hall, Mortuary Chapel and several churches, were opened for Heritage Open Days in September 2007, the first time this had been done.

Sport and leisure
A number of sports personalities live in the town, including cricketers James Foster and Ryan ten Doeschate, and footballer Harry Kane.

Loughton Leisure Centre at Traps Hill, managed by a private operator on behalf of the Epping Forest District Council, includes a swimming pool complex and fitness facilities. Other large commercial sports and leisure facilities are also to be found in the area.

 Athletics - Members of the Loughton Athletic Club, based at the Pavilion in Southview Road and affiliated to the Essex AAA, compete in a variety of regional track and field competitions, including the Women's Southern League and the Men's Southern League.
 Bowls - Loughton Bowls Club has its ground at Eleven Acre Rise.
 Cricket - Loughton Cricket Club was founded in 1879, and plays in the Shepherd Neame Essex League. Its cricket ground, complete with thatched pavilion, and facing the war memorial, is one of the town's most important open spaces, and originated as a field named Mott's Piece. One of the earliest presidents of the Loughton Cricket Club was Julius Rohrweger, a local German extraction who owned Uplands, a large house adjacent to the cricket ground. As he was politically a Liberal, the local Conservative party created and supported for some time a rival team, the Loughton Park Cricket Club, though this no longer exists.The South Loughton Cricket Club was founded in 1938, and plays at the Roding Road Cricket Ground. In 2007, its 1st XI became Ten-17 Herts & Essex League champions, having won the title following three consecutive promotions. The club also runs four other teams playing league and friendly cricket, and has a junior section. The club was one of the first in the UK to gain Sport England's prestigious 'Clubmark' accreditation. It is an ECB 'Focus Club'.
 Fencing - Loughton Fencing Club meets at Debden Park High School.
 Football - At Willingale Road Playing Fields and at the Roding Valley Recreation Ground a variety of local football teams play. Loughton Town FC & Coppice Row play their home games at the latter, in the Essex Sunday Combination & The Harlow and District League respectively. GFA Loughton FC, founded in 2014, have youth teams in the Echo Junior League as well as running Grassroots Football Academy, a Youth Football Academy at GGSK College, Roding Lane IG9. 
Total Football Mania run 6 a side football adult leagues at the site behind Oakwood Hill nature reserve on the grounds of Chigwell private school.
Loughton FC, founded in 1965, dropped out of the Hertfordshire Senior County League in 2007 and now plays in the Bishops Stortford, Stansted and District League and has youth teams in the Echo Junior League and the Barking Youth League. Ron Greenwood (1921–2006), manager of the England football team 1977–82, lived in Loughton for some years at 18 Brooklyn Avenue. The Football Academy UK opened in July 2007 on the site of the Britannia Sports Club in Langston Road.

 Golf - Loughton Golf Club owns a 9-hole course in Clays Lane. There are many other golf courses close by, including Abridge Golf and Country Club, Chigwell Golf Club, Chingford Golf Club, Royal Epping Forest Golf Club, Theydon Bois Golf Club, West Essex Golf Club, Woodford Golf Club and Woolston Manor Golf Club.
 Horse-riding - Horseriders need to be registered with the Epping Forest conservators before they are allowed to ride in the forest. 
 Mountain-biking - Mountain biking is generally permitted except around Loughton Camp and Ambresbury Banks (both Iron Age forts), Loughton Brook and other ecologically or geomorphologically sensitive areas. Epping Forest was considered as a venue for the mountain-biking event of the 2012 Summer Olympics, though a later (but subsequently abandoned) choice was Weald Country Park near Brentwood, Essex.
 Orienteering and Rambling - Several long-distance footpaths pass through Loughton, including the Forest Way and the London Outer Orbital Path, and shorter walks are also popular, especially in Epping Forest. Chigwell & Epping Forest Orienteering Club was founded in 1966, and active orienteering in Epping Forest takes place most weekends. West Essex Ramblers, founded in 1970, are the local rambling club for Loughton. The most important event in the ramblers calendar in the area is the traditional Epping Forest Centenary Walk, an all-day event commemorating the saving of Epping Forest as a public space, which takes place annually on the fourth Sunday in September.
 Speedway -The first event at High Beach near Loughton was staged on 19 February 1928.
 Swimming - Epping Forest District Swimming Club, founded in 1977, meets at Loughton Leisure Centre.
 Tennis - The Avenue Lawn Tennis Club has four artificial grass courts at its ground between The Avenue and Lower Park Road. From November 2006 to March 2007, the tennis courts were resurfaced with a new layer of astroturf and sand. There is a children's half-court with a basketball net. The courts surround the club house which (among other things) contains a table tennis table and a pool table. The Town Council maintains tennis courts on the Roding Valley, but those which are part of the Loughton Bowls and Lawn Tennis Club are disused.
 Taekwondo - Loughton Taekwondo meets at Debden Park High School. The club ranked top 5 at the BTCB National Taekwondo Championships in 2010 with 4 athletes becoming British Champion. The instructor Chan Sau won England's first ever gold medal at the 2008 Commonwealth Games in Canada.
 Karate - The Loughton Karate Club meets at The Lopping Hall or the Loughton Club Tuesdays, Fridays and Sundays

Transport
Junction 5 (south) of the M11 motorway linking Cambridge to London is accessed at Loughton's eastern boundary. The junction does not permit entry to north-bound carriageway, nor exit southbound. The M11 was constructed in a number of phases beginning in the 1970s and finally opening in the 1980s.

Railway

Loughton is served by both Loughton tube station and, further north-east, Debden tube station, both served by the Central line of the London Underground since 1949. The current Loughton station was opened in 1940, but both the line and stations existed before that; the railway line dates back to 22 August 1856, when the branch from Stratford was opened by the Eastern Counties Railway. Debden station was named "Chigwell Lane" from 1865 until 1949 (though for a few months in 1865 it was "Chigwell Road").

Bus
Bus routes in Loughton are either London Buses routes, commercial routes or Essex County Council contract routes.

Education

In 2006, schools in Loughton had approximately 2330 places in post-16 education, approximately 1200 places in Key Stage 4, approx. 1700 places in Key Stage 3, approximately 1500 places in Key Stage 2 and approximately 600 places in Key Stage 1 - almost all of which were in comprehensive schools. Davenant Foundation has always had a sixth form; the other two secondary schools opened sixth forms in September 2015.

Primary schools

 Alderton Infant and Junior Schools
 Hereward Primary School
 Staples Road Primary School (an amalgamation of Staples Road Infant and Junior Schools in 2011)
 Thomas Willingale School
 White Bridge Primary School (an amalgamation of White Bridge Infant and Junior Schools in 2014/2015)
 St John Fisher Catholic Primary School

Secondary schools

 Davenant Foundation School
 Debden Park High School
 Roding Valley High School

Faith schools

 St. John Fisher Catholic Primary School - a voluntary aided school, whose Board consisting of appointees from the Catholic Church controls the admission policy whilst the Essex Local Education Authority provides its funding.
 Davenant Foundation School - founded in Whitechapel in 1680, and moved to Loughton in 1965–66. Despite its title, it is a voluntary aided school; the school is an ecumenical Christian school for 11- to 18-year-olds, which operates its own admissions policy based on parental attendance at any mainstream Christian church. In deference to its origins in a part of east London with a large Jewish population, Jewish children are also eligible.

Special schools

 Oak View School
 Woodcroft School

Independent schools
 Oaklands School (age 2½–11)

Colleges

 Debden House - residential adult education college
 East 15 Acting School - part of the University of Essex
 Epping Forest College - further education college
 LMAT - music academy

Notable people
Notable people associated with Loughton (apart from those listed above) include:

 Dick Turpin (1705–1739), notorious highwayman, was familiar with Epping Forest (his butcher's shop was in Buckhurst Hill) and carried out many documented robberies in the area during the 1730s, sometimes escaping and hiding in the forest in Turpin's Cave.
 Thomas Willingale (1799–1870), whose name is associated with the campaign that resulted in the preservation of Epping Forest. A plaque commemorating him is to be found in the wall of St John's Church at Church Lane.
 James Cubitt (1836–1912), architect, best known for his design of nonconformist chapels such as the Union Chapel, Islington and the Welsh Church in Charing Cross Road in London, lived from c. 1880 onwards at Brook Villas and Cotsall Eaton Villas on the High Road, and spent the last years of his life at Monghyr Cottage in Traps Hill.
 Everard Calthrop (1857–1927), railway engineer and parachute pioneer, lived at 'Goldings' from the early 1900s onwards.
 Sir Leonard Erskine Hill (1866–1952), physiologist
 Vaughan and Rosalind Nash, respectively journalist/ political secretary, and biographer of Florence Nightingale
 Dr Millais Culpin (1874–1953), surgeon and pioneer of psychiatry, lived at 'Slyder's Gate' and then 'The Meads', both in Church Hill, from 1913 onwards – a fictionalised version of the romance between him and his future wife Ethel, a nurse at the Royal London Hospital, Whitechapel where they both worked, was dramatised in the BBC TV series Casualty 1907 in 2008 and Casualty 1909 in 2009.
 Sir Frank Baines (1877–1933), former Principal Architect of the government's Office of Works and chiefly known for designing Thames House and Imperial Chemical House in London, lived at 'Hillside' and built other large houses in Loughton.
 Major Greenwood (1880–1949), epidemiologist and statistician - Sir Leonard Hill gave him his first job after graduation as an assistant physiologist before he turned to his later career, and he later became a neighbour of the Hill family in Loughton
 Sidney Godley (1889–1957), first private soldier awarded the Victoria Cross during the Great War, is buried in Loughton Cemetery.
 Sir Hugh Cairns (1896–1952), neurosurgeon and advocate of the crash helmet, lived at Loughton whilst working at the London Hospital.
 Sir Austin "Tony" Bradford Hill (1897–1991), epidemiologist and statistician, and son of Sir Leonard Erskine Hill, grew up in the family home at Osborne House and published several research collaborations with Major Greenwood, a family friend.
 Captain Richard Been Stannard (1902-1977), recipient of the first Royal Naval Reserve Victoria Cross of the Second World War, once lived on The Avenue.
 Sir William Addison (1905–1992), historian and author, owned a bookshop in Loughton High Road for forty years.
 Commander Rupert Brabner (1911–1945), Conservative MP for Hythe 1939–1945 and WWII pilot with the Royal Navy, was born in Loughton
 James Edgar "Johnnie" Johnson (1915–2001), RAF fighter ace
 Len Murray (1922–2004), later Baron Murray of Epping Forest, leader of the Trades Union Congress 1973–1984, lived for over 50 years in The Crescent and played an active role in town life. He is commemorated by the Murray Hall, opened 2007.
 Matt Johnson (born 1961), frontman of the band the The, spent part of his childhood in "The Crown" pub, run by his parents Eddie and Shirley in the 1970s and 1980s.
 Alan Davies (born 1966), comedian, actor and broadcaster
 Joanna Forest (born 1977), classical soprano
 Richard Hounslow (born 1981), canoeing silver medallist at the 2012 Summer Olympics
 Gary Hooper (born 1988), Glasgow Celtic footballer

See also
Loughton incinerator thefts – employees stole banknotes intended for destruction

References

External links

 Loughton Town Council

 
Towns in Essex
Epping Forest District
Civil parishes in Essex